Military communications or military signals involve all aspects of communications, or conveyance of information, by armed forces. Examples from Jane's Military Communications include text, audio, facsimile, tactical ground-based communications, naval signalling, terrestrial microwave, tropospheric scatter, satellite communications systems and equipment, surveillance and signal analysis, security, direction finding and jamming.

Military communications span from pre-history to the present. The earliest military communications were delivered by runners. Later, communications progressed to visual and audible signals, and then advanced into the electronic age.

History

In past centuries communicating a message usually required someone to go to the destination, bringing the message. Thus, the term communication often implied the ability to transport people and supplies. A place under siege was one that lost communication in both senses. The association between transport and messaging declined in recent centuries.

The first military communications involved the use of runners or the sending and receiving of simple signals (sometimes encoded to be unrecognizable). The first distinctive uses of military communications were called semaphore. Modern units specializing in these tactics are usually designated as signal corps. The Roman system of military communication (cursus publicus or cursus vehicularis) is an early example of this. Later, the terms signals and signaller became words referring to a highly-distinct military occupation dealing with general communications methods (similar to those in civil use) rather than with weapons.

Present-day military forces of an informational society conduct intense and complicated communicating activities on a daily basis, using modern telecommunications and computing methods. Only a small portion of these activities are directly related to combat actions. Modern concepts of network-centric warfare (NCW) rely on network-oriented methods of communications and control to make existing forces more effective.

Military communications equipment

Drums, horns, flags, and riders on horseback were some of the early methods the military used to send messages over distances. The advent of distinctive signals led to the formation of the signal corps, a group specialized in the tactics of military communications. The signal corps evolved into a distinctive occupation where the signaller became a highly technical job dealing with all available communications methods including civil ones.

In the middle 20th century radio equipment came to dominate the field. Many modern pieces of military communications equipment are built to both encrypt and decode transmissions and survive rough treatment in hostile climates. They use different frequencies to send signals to other radios and to satellites.

Military communications – or "comms" – are activities, equipment, techniques, and tactics used by the military in some of the most hostile areas of the earth and in challenging environments such as battlefields, on land (compare radio in a box), underwater and also in air. Military comms include command, control and communications and intelligence and were known as the C3I model before computers were fully integrated. The U.S. Army expanded the model to C4I when it recognized the vital role played by automated computer equipment to send and receive large, bulky amounts of data.

In the modern world, most nations attempt to minimize the risk of war caused by miscommunication or inadequate communication.  As a result, military communication is intense and complicated, and often motivates the development of advanced technology for remote systems such as satellites and aircraft, both crewed and uncrewed, as well as computers. Computers and their varied applications have revolutionized military comms. Although military communication is designed for warfare, it also supports intelligence-gathering and communication between adversaries, and thus sometimes prevents war.

The six categories of military comms are:

 alert measurement systems
 cryptography
 military radio systems
 nuclear command and control
 signal corps
 network-centric warfare 

The alert measurement systems are various states of alertness or readiness for the armed forces used around the world during a state of war, act of terrorism or a military attack against a state. They are known by different acronyms, such as DEFCON, or defense readiness condition, used by the U.S. Armed Forces.

Cryptography is the study of methods of converting messages to a form unreadable except to one who knows how to decrypt them.  This ancient military comms art gained new importance with the rise of radio systems whose signals traveled far and were easily intercepted.  Cryptographic software is also widely used in civilian commerce.

Commercial refile 
In United States military communications systems, commercial refile refers to sending a military message via a commercial communications network. The message may come from a military network, such as a tape relay network, a point-to-point telegraph network, a radio-telegraph network, or the Defense Switched Network.

Commercial refiling of a message will usually require a reformatting of the message, particularly the heading.

See also
 Jane's Military Communications
 Command and control
 Signal Corps (disambiguation)
 Telecommunications
 Communications protection
 Electronic warfare
 Signals intelligence (SIGINT)
 Defence Information Infrastructure
 Kiev Military Institute of Control and Signals
Luftwaffe radio equipment of World War II
 Bowman (British Army communications system)
 Parakeet (Australian Army communications system)
 Military Wireless Museum in the Midlands
 Telegraph troops

Forms of signalling
 Military hand and arm signals
 Morse code
 Flag semaphore
 Flag signals
 Naval flag signalling
 Signal lamp
 Heliograph
 Radio communications
 Wireless telegraphy

References

External links

Signal Corps History
Signal Corps Officer Candidate School History

 
Combat support occupations
Telecommunications